Pri Xi is a New Zealand born actor. She was born on 28 July 1991 in Wellington.

Xi began her professional acting career as a teenager in the first series of The Killian Curse. Her first movie role was as Kirstie MacMorrow in the film The Water Horse: Legend of the Deep.

In 2013 Xi participated in the Actors Program and taking part in the end of year production of Tennessee Williams Camino Real. In 2014 she played the part of Saunders in the Auckland Theatre Company's production of Noël Coward's play Fallen Angels.

Filmography

References

External links

1991 births
Living people
New Zealand film actresses
21st-century New Zealand actresses
Place of birth missing (living people)
New Zealand people of Chinese descent